Haussmann–Saint-Lazare is a station on the RER in Paris, France. Opened on 14 July 1999 as the terminus of the new Line E, it is situated beneath Boulevard Haussmann and directly connected to Paris–Saint-Lazare, Auber RER, and two metro stations.

Engineering
The architecture of Haussmann–Saint-Lazare closely resembles that of Magenta. Following the earlier model of Charles de Gaulle–Étoile, its main train hall houses two lines under a single cathedral-like vault with lateral platforms. As at Magenta, the hall is supplemented by an additional two "half-stations" on either side, each with one platform.

A "cathedral station", Haussmann–Saint-Lazare is remarkable for its relatively lavish proportions. A long term project to extend the Line E to the west, forming a new cross-Paris axis, was approved in February 2011.

The station's construction cost was €275 million.

Scale
Haussmann–Saint-Lazare forms part of a complex of connected underground stations (see below). Due to the scale of Auber in particular, this ensemble represents a notably large underground public space in terms of volume.

Train services
The station is served by the following service(s):

Commuter services (RER E) from Haussmann–Saint-Lazare to Chelles–Gournay
Commuter services (RER E) from Haussmann–Saint-Lazare to Tournan

Connected stations
 Saint-Lazare
 Metro Line 3
 Metro Line 12
 Metro Line 13
 Metro Line 14
 Saint-Augustin
 Metro Line 9
Havre-Caumartin
 Metro Line 3
 Metro Line 9
 Auber
 RER Line A
Opéra
 Metro Line 3
 Metro Line 7
 Metro Line 8
 Gare Saint-Lazare (SNCF)

Gallery

See also

 List of stations of the Paris RER
 List of stations of the Paris Métro

References

External links
 

Réseau Express Régional stations
Railway stations in France opened in 1999
Buildings and structures in the 9th arrondissement of Paris